Virginia's 2nd House of Delegates district is one of 100 seats in the Virginia House of Delegates, the lower house of the state's bicameral legislature. District 2 represents parts of Prince William and Stafford counties. The seat is currently held by Democrat Candi King.

Elections

2017
The seat was previously held by Republican L. Mark Dudenhefer. He announced in January 2017 he would not seek reelection.
Democrat Jennifer Carroll Foy won the June 2017 primary to become the Democratic candidate. She initially faced Republican Laquan Austion; however he withdrew from the race in August 2017. Republicans selected Michael Makee to run instead. Carroll Foy won the November general election.

2019
Carroll Foy was re-elected.

2021 special election

Carroll Foy resigned effective December 12, 2020, to focus on her campaign for the 2021 Virginia gubernatorial election. Democrat Candi King won an election to fill the seat on January 5, 2021.

District officeholders

References

External links
 2nd House of Delegates district map

002
Prince William County, Virginia
Stafford County, Virginia